Gina Luria Walker is Professor of Women's Studies and Director of The New Historia at The New School in New York City. She teaches Women's Intellectual History and is one of world's foremost scholars on eighteenth-century feminist intellectual Mary Hays and her circle.

Walker's core focus is recovering the lost contributions of historical women. In 2015, Walker partnered with the Elizabeth A. Sackler Center for Feminist Art at the Brooklyn Museum to direct Project Continua, a website devoted to female biographies. Her latest work in regaining women displaced from the historical record is The New Historia, a project that is an encyclopedia  of female networks and intellectual contributions. This project will launch in March 2022.

Professor Walker previously held faculty appointments at Rutgers University and Sarah Lawrence College and is current a Professor of Women's Studies at The New School.

Biography 
Gina Luria Walker received her Ph.D. in 18th Century Literature from New York University where she was awarded the Founders’ Day Award for doctoral studies. These included her discovery of primary documents by and about Mary Hays (1759-1843) in private hands, now part of The Carl H. Pforzheimer Collection of Shelley and His Circle at The New York Public Library. Her areas of research include the history of learned women, women and Rational Dissent, late Enlightenment Feminisms, and women's autodidactic production of new knowledge.

Professor Walker is a member of the International Advisory Board, UDC International Doctoral School, Universidade da Coruña, Spain and on the Advisory Editorial Board, Enlightenment and Dissent, Dr Williams's Centre for Dissenting Studies, Queen Mary University of London. She is actively involved in encouraging new Wikipedia encyclopedia articles on historical women and is an authority on historical encyclopedias as well as a pioneer in the global project of feminist historical recovery of earlier women.

Early life and education 
Walker completed her undergraduate work at Barnard College and earned her master's degree at Columbia University. At Columbia, she intended to study the writer Jane Austen, placing her in the intellectual spectrum of the late Enlightenment. The graduate student adviser discouraged her by saying that “there was nothing more to be learned about Jane Austen”. Walker ultimately wrote her thesis on the personal writings of James Boswell––using his recently discovered journals as source material––as viewed through the prism of Jean-Paul Sartre's Being and Nothingness (1943). Her advisor praised her thesis but told her she was “too pretty to bother with a Ph.D.” and that she should “go home and get married.”

Greatly discouraged, she nevertheless applied to New York University to pursue doctoral research. She intended to study “a highly self-conscious woman on the margins of the late Enlightenment”. Kenneth Neill Cameron (1908–1994), the Oxford-trained scholar and expert on Percy Bysshe Shelley, became her adviser. Unlike her previous academic counselors, Cameron agreed that she could study Jane Austen. It was Cameron who first encouraged her to visit the New York Public Library's Carl H. Pforzheimer Collection, of which he was the founding Director, as ask to see what information was available about Mary Hays.

Mary Hays 
After researching the available material on Mary Hays in the Pforzheimer Library, Walker received a grant to meet with the owner of Hays’ private correspondence in London. The owner of the letters was reluctant to share them because Hays had been a controversial figure during her lifetime. Her writing was criticized for questioning the inequality of the sexes, and she was personally attacked for pursuing knowledge (historically a male occupation) and being homely. In 1800, Samuel Taylor Coleridge referred to her as “a Thing, ugly and petticoated.”

On the last day of her visit, the owner of the letters permitted Walker to view the 115 private letters to and from Hays in correspondence with Mary Wollstonecraft, William Godwin, Mary Shelley, Robert Southey, Eliza Fenwick and others. Walker felt a complicated relationship with Mary Hays:

“While I wanted to understand, empathize with, and defend Hays, her authorial self was so unlike the wise, steady persona presented by Austen’s narrators that had inspired me, that I, too, could not warm to her. She was angry, self-pitying, narcissistic, filled with resentment and yearning. Her unquiet spirit struggled against the tide of responses to her as unlovely, abrasive, and unlovable, confirmation that no respectable man would want her. Studying Hays seemed to take me further away from the apparently safe, hallowed shores of the Canon. I felt adrift; as an uncredentialled female autodidactic, Hays offered no safety.”

In 1972, Walker was awarded a doctorate for her work on Mary Hays. Hays' biographies of historical women struck Walker; she wondered why Hays would undertake such a project, a departure from her earlier philosophical work. Mary Hays had been a close friend of early feminist philosopher Mary Wollstonecraft, author of A Vindication of the Rights of Woman. When Wollstonecraft passed away from complications of childbirth in 1797, Hays mourned her death by compiling biographies of 302 iconoclastic women. She wrote as a way to channel her pain and fortify herself by documenting the accomplishments of great female thinkers of the past. It was one of the earliest instances of feminist historical recovery.

Hays’ instinct to document the lives of neglected historical women would inspire the course of Walker's career.”

Academic work

Female Biography Project 
In 2009, the editorial board of the library at Chawton House––an estate once owned Jane Austen’s brother that now supports the recovery of early women’s writing––commissioned Walker to reproduce Mary Hays’ Female Biography; or, Memoirs of Illustrious and Celebrated Women, Of All Ages and Countries (1803). Walker's edition was published in 2013 and 2014 by Pickering & Chatto.

In order to re-create Hays’ work with all the new evidence available, Walker established a network of 200 scholars, representing 164 institutions in 18 countries, who collaborated to burnish the “female biographies” of the women Hays had included. These scholars, working under the name Female Biography Project, recovered historical material about previously lost women.

Project Continua 
Project Continua launched in 2012 as the online compendium to the Female Biography Project. Scholars realized they had surpassed Mary Hays's source material yet continued to uncover female philosophers and intellectuals who had been lost to history. The goal was to create a public, multimedia resource dedicated to the preservation of women's intellectual history from the earliest surviving evidence into the 21st century.  "There have always been women producing knowledge and contributing to human understanding and participating in the great events and new ideas of their time," said Walker in an interview. "Most of whom have been ignored, trivialized, or written out." The project features biographies and references to additional source material for scholars interested in conducting further research. Walker partnered with the Elizabeth A. Sackler Center for Feminist Art at the Brooklyn Museum to advance the site.

Walker and the scholars initially believed they were supplementing the traditional historical canon with new information––hence the name Project Continua––but as the scope of previously unknown and suppressed material came to light, they renamed their effort The New Historia.

Wikipedia 
Disturbed by the gender disparity of Wikipedia's content, Walker started an Edit-A-Thon in 2015 to train more women as Wikipedia editors.
Wikipedia is the Internet's largest source of free information, yet less than ten percent of Wikipedia editors are women, and only six percent of experienced editors are women. This is reflected in the site's content which is distorted in favor of men's contributions to science and philosophy.

“Historically, Wikipedia may not be that different from the very first encyclopedias, which developed as a way for educated men to communicate with each other and create foundational knowledge” said Gina Luria Walker during an interview with The Atlantic. "Around 150 men contributed to the great encyclopedia of the Enlightenment, Walker pointed out, but no women did. The very first version of Encyclopædia Britannica, written between 1768 and 1771, featured 39 pages on curing disease in horses, and three words on woman: 'female of man'."

In particular, Wikipedia suffers from an age-old sexist tendency, that of defining a woman by her relationship status with a man.“The pages that do exist about notable women are more likely to mention their gender and relationship status than articles about men.”

“There needs to be a conscious collaborative determination by women, including girls, that we want to know about women of the past, we want to have access to our foremothers, and that we want to revise history,” Walker said. “Every time a woman is denied the full weight of what she has achieved, it is a loss for all of us,” Walker said.

The New Historia 
Walker and the scholars feared their research would follow a trajectory common to historical women: initially, their stories would be included in publications, then treated anecdotally, and eventually lost and neglected, repeating the established treatment of women in history. Walker, having exhumed biographical information about and philosophical writing by thousands of previously lost historical women and motivated by her Wikipedia project, wanted to publish her findings without bias and make them accessible to all. Thus, she began the development of The New Historia as a non-traditional approach to preserving female works. 

Walker states her motivation behind the project:

“More women wrote texts and contributed to society in the past than we can possibly believe. They left evidence of their lives and then disappeared; sometimes they were resurrected, only to be buried again. Their work was lost through either intentional destruction or neglect, leaving a void of women’s historical invisibility. Our work today is reconstructing the lost knowledge of women’s ideas and productions. If we persist in only studying women through the prisms of male-knowledge ordering systems, old inaccuracies will remain, and history will continue to ignore past female thinkers and actors and their transformative responses to the obdurate presence of historical misogyny.“

The New Historia was a response to a saying in gender studies called “just add women and stir” that Walker frequently heard with the premise being, that if stories of a few great women are added to the traditional canon, history is now “inclusive.” Walker believed that the "truth is that with this approach the traditional, male-dominated history isn't challenged in any way––it's still the same narrative and interpretation, and over time, the women will disappear from the narrative." On this note, 

To create an entirely new approach to feminist history, in 2018 Walker began enlisting scholars for important female figures throughout history in an attempt to capture their work and reinvigorate their narratives to prevent women from "just being stirred." As an easily navigable website, also referred to as "a Wikipedia for significant yet unseen women," The New Historia calls for accuracy and accountability in imagining undiscovered women. Walker's efforts intend to uncover buried women by making their work public and easily accessible.

Users can explore a collection of all-female historical figures to explore each woman's work, publications, and networks of relationships. Instead of historical data about women being relegated to a handful of written pages––where it risks being lost, yet again, in the traditional historical narrative––users step inside the data, into a new dimension of learning and knowing historical women. A searchable digital archive connects modern women with their mostly unknown foremothers who were female groundbreakers of the past.

The project is set to launch in March 2022.

Women and textiles 
Looking for ways women created and produced knowledge and influence outside the traditional narrative, Walker studies the history of women and textiles. Textile production has historically been a trade associated with women. New translations of Bronze Age texts reveal women were central to global trade since antiquity––not only in manufacturing cloth but in running textile empires. Ancient women owned wealth and property independently of their husbands. However, their work was not considered “professional” because it was done inside the home. Walker researches women's global influence in the textile trade during the Bronze Age through the medieval period. By examining these textiles, she uncovers the “text” embedded within the work. From these “texts,” the lives and work of invisible female artisans is revealed, and history is better represented through their intricacies.

Books and publication history

As author 
Rational Passions: Women and Scholarship in Britain, 1702–1870, A Reader (with Felicia Gordon, University of Toronto Press, 2008); 
Mary Hays: The Growth of a Woman's Mind (Ashgate, 2006); 
Everywoman (with Virginia Tiger, edited by Toni Morrison, Random House, 1978)

As editor 
Mary Hays’s ‘Female Biography’: Collective Biography as Enlightenment Feminism (with Mary Spongberg, Routledge, 2019); 
Chawton House Library Edition of Mary Hays’s Female Biography; or Memoirs of Illustrious and Celebrated Women, of All Ages and Countries, 6 vols. (as editor, Pickering & Chatto, 2013, 2014); 
The Idea of Being Free: A Mary Hays’s Reader (as editor, Broadview Press, 2006); 
William Godwin’s Memoirs of the Author of A Vindication of the Rights of Woman (as editor with Pamela Clemit, Broadview Press, 2001); 
The Feminist Controversy in England: 1788–1810 (1974, Garland Publishing Company). 44 works in 89 volumes by and about women with new introductions that proposed a new female canon for scholarly investigation.

Noteworthy scholarly contributions 
 "The Invention of Female Biography," Enlightenment and Dissent, (2014)
 "Women's Voices," Cambridge Companion to British Literature of the French Revolution in the 1790s (2011)
 "Intellectual Exchanges: Women and Rational Dissent," a special issue of Enlightenment and Dissent (2011)

References

External links 

 Gina Walker webpage

Year of birth missing (living people)
Living people
American women academics
Women's studies academics
New York University alumni
The New School faculty
Place of birth missing (living people)
21st-century American women